Milan Zagorac (Serbian Cyrillic: Милан Загорац; born 15 June 1980) is a Serbian football defender.

Playing career
Zagorac played for OFK Beograd before becoming the first foreign player to sign for FC Desna Chernihiv in 2003.

He also played with FK BSK Batajnica in the 1997–98 Serbian League Belgrade.

Zagorac signed with FC Inter Baku and played in the Azerbaijan Premier League between 2005 and 2010. He made appearances for Inter Baku in the 2008-2009 UEFA Champions League qualifiers and in the 2009–10 UEFA Europa League. Inter Baku was defeated by Partizan 3–1 on aggregate in the Champions League in 2008, with Zagorac playing in both matches. Inter Baku then subsequently lost 2–1 to Spartak Trnava in the Europa League on 2 July 2009.

Honours
Radnički Nova Pazova
 Serbian League Vojvodina: 2011–12
Inter Baku
Azerbaijan Premier League: 2009–10
Desna Chernihiv
 Ukrainian Second League: Runner Up 2003–04

References

External links
 Profile on Inter Baku's Official Site
 Milan Zagorac on Football-lineups
 Profile at FFU website

1980 births
Living people
Serbian footballers
Serbian expatriate footballers
Association football defenders
Ukrainian Premier League players
OFK Bečej 1918 players
FK Dinamo Pančevo players
1. FC Schweinfurt 05 players
Expatriate footballers in Germany
OFK Beograd players
FC Borysfen Boryspil players
FC Kryvbas Kryvyi Rih players
FC Desna Chernihiv players
Expatriate footballers in Ukraine
Serbian expatriate sportspeople in Ukraine
Shamakhi FK players
Expatriate footballers in Azerbaijan
FK Zemun players